Maso da San Friano (1536–1571) was an Italian painter active in Florence. His real name was Tomaso D'Antonio Manzuoli. He was born in San Friano and died in Florence.

According to Giorgio Vasari, Maso was a pupil of Pier Francesco Foschi while others claim it was Carlo Portelli. He collaborated with an elder Michelangelo on some projects.

His altarpiece of the Visitation was painted in 1560 for the church of San Pier Maggiore, Florence - now in Trinity Hall Chapel, Cambridge, England. A similar work can be seen in the Prato cathedral. After 1561, he painted in the church of Ognissanti, Florence and in the church of Santa Felicita. He participated in the decoration of the Studiolo of Francesco I with an oval canvas relating the Fall of Icarus story (1572). The canvas has an affected milling in individuals below and an anomalous perspective; both are classic features of mannerist painting. His second contribution Mining of Diamonds. A portrait of Ferdinando I de' Medici (1570) by Maso can be found in the Town Council Hall of Prato.

He is regarded as part of the Counter-Maniera or Counter-Mannerism movement in Florence. His most important pupils were Jacopo da Empoli and Alessandro Fei.

One of his paintings, thought to be of Cosimo I de Medici in 1560, is believed to be the oldest to show a watch.

References

Sources

1536 births
1571 deaths
People from the Province of Florence
16th-century Italian painters
Italian male painters
Painters from Florence
Mannerist painters